The Mall Bay Formation is an Ediacaran formation, cropping out in Newfoundland and possibly elsewhere. It is part of the Conception Group, underlying the Gaskiers Formation.

References 

Ediacaran Newfoundland and Labrador